A. K. M. Abu Zahed is a Bangladesh Nationalist Party politician and former member of parliament for Comilla-9.

Career
Zahed was elected to parliament for Comilla-9 as a Bangladesh Nationalist Party candidate in 1979.

References

Bangladesh Nationalist Party politicians
Living people
2nd Jatiya Sangsad members
Year of birth missing (living people)